Nielubowicz is a surname. Notable people with the surname include:

 Mary Joan Nielubowicz (1929–2008), American nurse
 Piotr Nielubowicz, Polish manager

See also
 

Polish-language surnames